Melchiorri is an Italian surname. Notable people with the surname include:

Anthony Melchiorri, American television personality
Federico Melchiorri (born 1987), Italian footballer
Manuela Melchiorri (born 1970), Italian swimmer

Italian-language surnames